The ICF Canoe Polo World Championships are international competitions in the sport of canoe polo. They have taken place every two years since 1994 (U21 since 2002), in a different venue each time. Medals are awarded by national team; the German team has won the most medals in total.

Men

Medal table

Women

Medal table

Men Under-21

Medal table

Women Under-21

Medal table

See also 
 International Canoe Federation
 European Canoe Polo Championships

Sources
 ICF Historic Results

References

 
World Championships
Polo

de:Kanupolo#Weltmeisterschaften